Vacuum molding most commonly refers to the metal casting process. It may also refer to:

Vacuum forming, a plastic forming process
Vacuum bag molding, a composite material forming process